Under a Godless Veil is Draconian's seventh studio album released on October 30, 2020, through Napalm Records. It is their first album since Arcane Rain Fell (2005) without longtime bassist Fredrik Johansson, who left the band in April, 2016. Daniel Änghede performed bass for this album. It is also their last album with Heike Langhans, who left the band in 2022. 

A lyric video for "Lustrous Heart" was released on May 5, 2020, followed by "Sorrow of Sophia" on July 16, 2020.

Track listing

Personnel 
 Heike Langhans – vocals
 Anders Jacobsson – vocals
 Johan Ericson – lead guitar, backing vocals
 Daniel Arvidsson – rhythm guitar, vocals on "The Sethian"
 Daniel Änghede – bass
 Jerry Torstensson – drums, percussion
 Daniel Neagoe – narration on "Burial Fields"

Production 
 Arranged and produced by Johan Ericson, additional string arrangement on "Sorrow of Sophia" by Erik Arvinder.

References 

2020 albums
Draconian (band) albums
Napalm Records albums